"A Crossbreed" (German: "Eine Kreuzung") is a short story by Franz Kafka.

The story is about an animal that is half-kitten, half-lamb. The narrator describes how the creature has characteristics of each breed of animal, yet also has distinctive attributes of its own. In much of the story, great care is taken to describe the animal's peculiar eating habits (e.g. drinking milk while showing fangs). Some analysis has been made to make parallels between this story and Tolstoy's emphasis on food and human behavior.

Like most of his works, Kafka wrote the story with no intent on it being published, though it was published posthumously in Beim Bau der Chinesischen Mauer (Berlin, 1931). The first English translation by Willa and Edwin Muir was published by Martin Secker in London in 1933. It appeared in The Great Wall of China. Stories and Reflections (New York City: Schocken Books, 1946).

References

Short stories by Franz Kafka
Short stories published posthumously
1910s short stories